was the pen name of , a Japanese author.
He was born in Yabu, Hyogo.
In 1947, he wrote a mystery short story  and was awarded a prize by the magazine .
He was discovered by Edogawa Rampo and became a novelist.
He wrote many ninja (忍法帖 Ninpōchō series) and mystery stories. Many of his works have been adapted for film, TV, manga, and anime.

Works in English translation

Novel
The Kouga Ninja Scrolls (original title: Kōga Ninpōchō), translation Geoff Sant (Del Rey, 2006)

Short story
"The Yellow Lodger" (original title: Kiiroi Geshukunin), translation Damian Flanagan (The Tower of London: Tales of Victorian London, Peter Owen, 2005) – A Sherlock Holmes pastiche

Awards
1949, the 2nd Detective Story Writers' Club Award
1997, the 45th Kikuchi Kan Prize
2000, the 4th Japan Mystery Award
2004, the Kodansha Manga Award for general manga for Basilisk, the manga adaptation of The Kouga Ninja Scrolls

Selected works

Ninja stories ("Ninpōchō" series)
 - adapted to film in 2005, to manga in 1963 and two times in 2003, and to anime in 2005 (based on one of 2003 manga).
 - adapted to film in 1963, and as a TV series in 1966.

 - adapted to film twice: in 1964 (as Kunoichi ninpō) and in 1991.
 - adapted to film twice in 1964 and 1992.
 - adapted to film in 1963, 1996, and 2011.
 - adapted to film in 1965, 1983 (TV), and 1994.
 - adapted to film in 1982  (as Ninja Wars) and to manga in 2004.

 - adapted to film in 1965 and 1968.
 - adapted to film in 1998 and to manga in 2005. 
 - adapted to film in 1969.
 - adapted to film in 1995.

 - adapted to film in 1981, 1996 and 2003, to anime in 1997 and to various manga.
 - adapted to film in 1968.

 - adapted to film in 1993.

 - adapted to TV in 2018.

Other fiction

 - adapted to manga in 1978.
 - adapted to film in 1956.

 - adapted to manga in 2006.
 - adapted to TV series in 1972, TV movie in 1983, v-cinema film in 1995, and to manga in 2006.
 - adapted to film in 1965.

 - adapted to TV series in 2001.

 - adapted to manga in 2000.

References

External links
Futarou Yamada Museum　
Permanent display in the Hyogo Net Museum of Literature 
Futaro Yamada at J'Lit Books from Japan 
 Synopsis of The Story of the Eight Dog Warriors (Hakkenden) at JLPP (Japanese Literature Publishing Project) 
The War Generation's Genius - comic about Futaro Yamada's early life

Japanese historical novelists
Japanese mystery writers
Japanese horror writers
Japanese lexicographers
Mystery Writers of Japan Award winners
1922 births
2001 deaths
People from Hyōgo Prefecture
Winner of Kodansha Manga Award (General)
20th-century Japanese novelists
20th-century lexicographers